Wydawnictwo Uniwersytetu Jagiellońskiego is a university press affiliated with the Jagiellonian University in Poland. Founded in 1996, it publishes about 200 books per year.

Jagiellonian University
University presses of Poland
1996 establishments in Poland
Publishing companies established in 1996
Mass media in Kraków